Arista is an unincorporated community and coal town in Mercer County, West Virginia, United States.

Arista was named for a mining official's wife.

References

Unincorporated communities in Mercer County, West Virginia
Unincorporated communities in West Virginia
Coal towns in West Virginia